Gramophone is a 2003 Indian Malayalam-language romantic comedy drama film directed by Kamal and written by Iqbal Kuttippuram, starring Dileep, Meera Jasmine and Navya Nair. The music was composed by Vidyasagar.

Plot 
Sachidanandan, is a very hard working person. He runs an antique shop, with his father's close friend, Pattu Set, but has many side businesses as well and is a man of principles. He is the son of famous singer Ravindranath, who was unsuccessful in his career, as he was cheated by one of his students named Arya Devi, who became a successful singer by plagiarizing Ravindranath's composition. Hence Ravindranath's close friends Pattu Set, Saigal Yousuf and Tabla Bhaskaran consider Arya Devi as the cause for his failure in his career. But, Sachi hates singing, as he believe his father's singing profession left him with huge debts. So, he always refuses to unleash his singing talents. He has a greedy mother , a greedy brother and an innocent sister.

His childhood friend, Jennifer, also a hardworking Jewish girl, works in a hotel as a cleaner, likes his personality and loves him, but her grandfather, Gregorious Gregory, and her whole family, other than Sara, Gregory's sister, dislikes him and his father. When their family got the chance to immigrate to Israel through the Law of Return, in condition to marry someone from Israel, was shattered when Sara falls in love with Ravindranath. Same kind of proposal was received by Jennifer, to marry Isahakh. So, he also doesn't want to repeat the same history of Jennifer loving Sachi. And for that sake, he always try to keep Jennifer away from Sachi.

When she got such a proposal to marry Isahakh, she accepted for marriage, as she wants to keep her family happy. Meanwhile, Pooja, the daughter of Arya Devi, along with Arya Devi and Arya Devi's Secretary, Mathachayan, lands at Kochi, to solve some property issues caused by her children. They coincidentally check-in in the same hotel, in which Jenni works. Arya Devi helps all those whom she hurt, including Sachi's family, by giving . In anger by her this act, he returns all those . This makes Pooja to respect and love Sachi.

While cleaning Arya Devi's room, Jenni finds a beautiful dress, and she mistakenly wears it, and was caught red handed, but left without anything. This marks Jenni's introduction to Pooja, and soon these two girls become very close friends.

Arya Devi and her family, who were leading a luxurious life, fell into debt and had not enough money to pay the hotel, and had started living in rent in a small house. Knowing of this, Sachi decides to clear off their debts, by taking loan himself and paying the hotel rent. This made Pooja's love stronger.

At the same time, Jenni too wanted to handover Sachi to someone like herself, as she knew she had to leave him in a few days. So she decided to set Pooja for Sachi. But Sachi was completely against it, as he didn't want to keep any relationship with Arya Devi.

Pooja started working with Jenni to clear off debts, and coincidentally sees her childhood friend, who was too a singer, and told him about Sachi's talent of singing. When Sachi got to know about this, though he disagreed at first, but agreed at last, and a bunch of albums were sent to Pooja's friend. But her friend cheated everyone, by translating the song into Hindi, and publishing it. Then Pooja reveals that she didn't know about it, and was a conspiracy by her mother, and asked for sorry on behalf of her mother, and cleared the debts with the money that they got from album and returned.

At the same time, countdown had started for Jenni to go back Israel. At that time, Sara wishes to meet her lover's son, Sachi, and he completes her wish. And after that, she dies. After her death, Gregory confesses that Isahakh had already informed Gregory that he hadn't taken the ticket for Sara, as everyone used to consider Sara a cheater. And finally, it's the day to depart. Everyone is very sad. After departure, Sachi realized that he used to love her, and he should have asked Jenni to not leave him. And then Pattu Set consoles him. Then there comes a twist. All of them realized Isahakh had cheated them by taking ticket only for Jenni, and not others. Due to this, Jenni's family finally drops their plans, and decides to live in Kerala only, and Gregory asks sorry for hurting him. The film ends with Sachi confessing his love to her and they hug each other.

Cast

Soundtrack
The film's soundtrack contains 6 songs, all composed by Vidyasagar. Lyrics were by Girish Puthenchery, Piyush Soni and Sachidhanandan Puzhankara.

References

External links 
 

2000s Malayalam-language films
2003 films
Indian romantic musical films
Films shot in Kochi
Films directed by Kamal (director)
Films scored by Vidyasagar
Indian romantic comedy-drama films
2000s romantic musical films